Kaliningradsky (masculine), Kaliningradskaya (feminine), or Kaliningradskoye (neuter) may refer to:
Kaliningrad economic region, one of twelve economic regions of Russia
Kaliningrad Oblast (Kaliningradskaya Oblast), a federal subject of Russia
Kaliningradskaya (brand), a Russian brand of vodka